Arcsine law may refer to:
Arcsine distribution
Arcsine laws (Wiener process), describing one-dimensional random walks
Erdős arcsine law, concerning the prime divisors of a number